The World Governance Index (WGI) is an indicator developed in 2008 by the Forum for a new World Governance (FnWG).  It aims to provide, year on year, a precise image of the situation of world governance and of its evolution.  Based on the picture it provides on where the world and its individual countries stand in terms of governance, this index is intended to allow those in charge of governance to raise the appropriate questions when thinking about solutions and remedies for what constitutes one of the major problems of the 20th century.

Background 

Developing a set of indicators in order to produce a World Governance Index (WGI) is a long and complex undertaking. The idea is to measure a contemporary concept which, in spite of the fact that it is historically rooted, that there are frameworks in which it is currently applied, that it is implemented by identified actors, and that there is agreement on the diagnosis of its afflictions, it is as yet far from having been "stabilized."

Basing their work on the United Nations Millennium Declaration, which was the subject of unprecedented U.N. consensus among the heads of state and government who adopted it in 2000, a team of researchers of the Forum for a new World Governance (FnWG), made up of Gustavo Marín, Arnaud Blin, and Renaud François, focused its research on the five main concepts defining the application framework of world governance and constituting key goals to be reached by 2015:

 Peace / Security
 Democracy / Rule of Law
 Human Rights / Participation
 Sustainable Development
 Human Development

What is the purpose of a WGI? 

The research team considered its mission with two goals in mind:

 The first was to create a World Governance Index (WGI) providing an overall picture of world governance at time T based on data obtained for the 179 countries included in the survey. The WGI combines 5 indicators, each made up of 13 sub-indicators, each of those made up of 37 indexes. These indexes were selected from among the best available databases. They are all provided by recognized sources, well known for their quality, seriousness, and reliability.

 The second goal is to motivate world-governance actors to consider the resulting WGI and the relative importance of the different indicators. This should allow them to identify the "key" or "pilot" indicators that will set up the conditions for good world governance and, more importantly, guarantee their sustainability. The ultimate goal of this study is part of a long-term process. On the basis of the situation described by the WGI and of its diagnosis, it should allow actors in charge of governance to raise the right questions in order to consider solutions.

Methodology and databases 

The 37 indexes constituting the WGI have been set on a scale from zero to one, a scale similar to the one developed by the United Nations Development Programme for its Human Development Index (HDI).

Although some of the indexes used (only 4 out of the 37) were drawn from databases that had not been updated since 2007, the 2008 World Governance Index nevertheless reflects the state of world governance in 2008.

The regional rankings are inspired from UNDP classification. The 179 countries surveyed in this study —microstates were deliberately not included in this list – were grouped into six regional subgroups:

 Africa
 European Union / OECD
 Latin America / Caribbean
 Asia / Pacific
 Arab World
 NIS / Central Asia / Balkans

Sources 

World Governance Index: PDF document, 81 pages.

References 

Demographics indicators